An election for the Wansbeck District Council was held on 4 May 1995.  The Labour Party took all of the 46 seats, and therefore maintained control of the council. Turnout was 37.4%.

Election result

See also
Wansbeck District Council elections

References 

District council elections in England
Council elections in Northumberland
Wansbeck District Council elections